Cranmer House, also known as Kerwin House, is a historic two-story, stucco-clad Italian Renaissance Revival house at 200 Cherry Street in Denver, Colorado.  The house was built in 1917 for George E. Cranmer, who was Denver Manager of Improvement and Parks.  It was designed by architect Jacques Benedict.  An addition built in the late 1920s, including a dormer, was designed by architect Burnham Hoyt. The house was purchased by Thomas and Mary Ann Kerwin, one of the co-founders of La Leche League, in the 1960s; they and their children resided there for 30 years.

The house was listed on the National Register of Historic Places in 2005.

References

Houses on the National Register of Historic Places in Colorado
Renaissance Revival architecture in Colorado
Houses completed in 1917
Houses in Denver
National Register of Historic Places in Denver